Elisabeth Auguste of Neuburg (Elisabeth Auguste Sofie; 1693–1728) was the only surviving child of Charles III Philip, Elector Palatine. The Palatinate-Neuburg line became extinct with her father and was succeeded by the Palatinate-Sulzbach line. Her sons with Count Palatine Joseph Charles of Sulzbach would have been the indisputable heirs to the Electorate of the Palatinate, but they all died in infancy. She was the Hereditary Princess of Sulzbach by marriage.

Life

Of Charles Philip's six children (five daughters and one stillborn son), Elisabeth Auguste was the only one to reach adulthood. She was the third daughter of Charles III Philip, then Count Palatine of Neuburg, and his first wife, Ludwika Karolina Radziwiłł. One of her sisters, Maria Anna, died before Elisabeth Auguste was born, aged one or two, and her sister Leopoldine died the year she was born, aged three. Her mother died on 25 March 1695, when Elisabeth Auguste was about two years old, and her father remarried when she was about eight years old to Princess Teresa Lubomirska. Her two half-sisters from her father's second marriage both died before turning three.

In 1716, her father succeeded his brother Johann Wilhelm as the Elector of the Palatinate. By then it was evident that the Palatinate-Neuburg line (established by two grandsons of Duke George of Bavaria, Otto Henry and Philip) would become extinct, as Charles III Philip and his brothers had all failed to produce a legitimate male heir. It was also obvious that the related Palatinate-Sulzbach line would succeed them. Joseph Charles, the eldest son of the Count Palatine of Sulzbach, was the clear heir. On 2 May 1717, Elisabeth Auguste married Joseph Charles in a move that united the two lines. The sons of the union would be the indisputable heirs of the Electorate of the Palatinate, preventing another succession war. However, all their sons died in infancy and only three daughters survived.

Elisabeth Auguste died in childbirth in 1728. Her husband died the following year in Oggersheim. The inheritance of the Electorate of the Palatinate passed to her husband's brother, John Christian Joseph's family. Upon her father's death in 1742, her husband's nephew, Charles Theodore, became Elector. Their daughter, also named Elizabeth Augusta, married Charles Theodore and became Electress.

Children
She was married in Innsbruck in 1717 to Count Palatine Joseph Charles Emanuel August of Sulzbach, son of Theodore Eustace of Sulzbach and Maria Eleonore of Hesse-Rotenburg. They had the following children:

 Charles Philip (1718–1724)
 Innocenza Maria (1719–1719)
 Elisabeth Auguste (1721–1794); married Charles Theodore, Elector of Bavaria
 Maria Anna (1722–1790); married Clement, Duke of Bavaria and Count Palatine
 Maria Francisca (1724–1794); married Frederick Michael, second son of Christian III, Duke of Zweibrücken
 Charles Philip August (1725–1728)
 a son, Pfalzgraf von der Pfalz (1728–1728)

Through her daughter Maria Francisca, she was a grandmother of Maximilian I Joseph of Bavaria. He succeeded Charles Theodore as Elector Palatine in 1799.

Sources
Geneanet

1693 births
1728 deaths
Deaths in childbirth
House of Wittelsbach
Countesses Palatine of Sulzbach
Countesses Palatine of Neuburg
Burials at St. Michael's Church, Munich
Daughters of monarchs